Canal Sur 2 is the second public television channel from Radio y Televisión de Andalucía (RTVA). It began broadcasting on 5 June 1998, under the name Canal 2 Andalucía.

With the launch of Canal 2 Andalucía, RTVA had to split its television broadcasts to two channels, leaving Canal Sur as a general entertainment and news channel, while Canal 2 Andalucía focuses on cultural, informative, sport and children's programmes.

On 5 June 2008, coinciding with the tenth anniversary of the channel, the channel was given a new look and renamed Canal Sur 2.

From October 2012, the channel is to cease broadcasting original material, and will instead be broadcasting the same programmes as Canal Sur.

References

External links
Official site of Canal Sur 2
Official site of RTVA

 
Radio y Televisión de Andalucía
Television channels and stations established in 1998
Spanish-language television stations